Jack Vidgen (born 17 January 1997) is an Australian singer, best known for winning the fifth season of Australia's Got Talent as a teenager. He subsequently signed a recording contract with Sony Music Australia with his debut single, "Yes I Am", and studio album, of the same name, were released in August 2011. The album debuted at number three on the ARIA Albums Chart, and was certified gold. His second studio album, Inspire, was released in April 2012, reaching number 23 on the ARIA Albums Chart. In 2019 Vidgen took part in season 8 of Australian The Voice and was eliminated after the Semi-Finals. He also appeared on America's Got Talent: The Champions. Vidgen has also appeared on I'm a Celebrity...Get Me Out of Here! in Australia.

Early life
Vidgen is the son of Steve Vidgen and Rachel Hayton. From 2007 to 2010, Vidgen performed at various events in Sydney, including Schools Spectacular, Eisteddfod, and the local Christmas carols. He also taught himself how to play the piano and guitar. He attended Balgowlah Boys High School. Following his win on Australia's Got Talent in 2011, Vidgen withdrew from his high school to continue by distance education. In March 2014, it was reported that he had a lesion removed from behind his eye. Vidgen is openly gay.

Career

2011: Australia's Got Talent

Vidgen auditioned for the fifth season of Australia's Got Talent in 2011, singing a rendition of Whitney Houston's "I Have Nothing". The performance earned a standing ovation from both the judges and the audience. Judge Kyle Sandilands said before the audition, "You're either gonna be amazing or dreadful – both I will enjoy", while judge Brian McFadden was so moved by the performance he ran up on stage to kiss Vidgen's cheek once it was over. The performance has received over 23 million views on YouTube. Vidgen was dubbed Australia's answer to Justin Bieber and inundated with international and local interest. He also attracted the attention of celebrity gossip blogger Perez Hilton, who posted several blogs of Vidgen's performances on his website.

Vidgen performed on the first semi-final show, singing a cover of "And I Am Telling You I'm Not Going" from the Dreamgirls soundtrack. After the performance, he earned another standing ovation from the judges and audience. Sandilands told Vidgen that he made him believe in reincarnation as he was sure Vidgen had a black woman inside him, while McFadden said Vidgen had one of the best voices he had ever heard. After winning the public vote from the first semi-final show, Vidgen progressed through to the next round, the final showdown. During this round, Vidgen performed a cover of Adele's "Set Fire to the Rain". After his performance, judge Dannii Minogue said, "Your voice lifts everybody who listens to it", while McFadden joked that he was jealous of Vidgen because he spelled the end for other guys in the music industry. Vidgen once again won the public vote, which made him progress through to the grand final. During this round, Vidgen performed an original song titled, "Yes I Am". A few days later, Vidgen was the centre of criticism over the song when it was revealed that it was co-written with two other people. Critics questioned how involved Vidgen was in the writing of the song. On 7 August 2011, Vidgen appeared on Sunday Night and said, "I sort of wrote the lyrics, and then I took them to vocal coach Erana Clark's studio, and we had the producer – I didn't write the music, I can say that, but I did write the lyrics."

Vidgen was announced as the winner of the season during the grand final decider show, which aired on 2 August 2011. He was awarded a prize of $250,000.

2011–2014: Record deal, Yes I Am and Inspire
Following his win on Australia's Got Talent, Vidgen signed a recording contract with Sony Music Australia. "Yes I Am" was released for digital download on 3 August 2011, as Vidgen's debut single. The song peaked at number 35 on the ARIA Singles Chart. Vidgen co-wrote the gospel soul-inspired song with former Australian Idol vocal coach Erana Clark and producer A2, who also penned the song, "Fly", for Vidgen's debut studio album also titled Yes I Am. The album was rush-released on 19 August 2011. It contained cover versions Vidgen performed on Australia's Got Talent, which were all produced by musical director Chong Lim, as well as the two original songs. The album debuted and peaked at number three on the ARIA Albums Chart, and was certified gold by the Australian Recording Industry Association (ARIA), for shipments of 35,000 units.

Vidgen's second studio album, Inspire, was released on 27 April 2012. It featured more covers of songs from artists including Michael Jackson, Bill Withers, Cyndi Lauper, John Lennon, and Beyoncé. The album peaked at number 23 on the ARIA Albums Chart, failing to match the success of his debut album. Vidgen's second single "Finding You", which was written by The Potbelleez' IIan Kidron, was released digitally on 10 July 2012. He performed the song on Australia's Got Talent the next day.  As of 2014, Vidgen is no longer signed to Sony Music Australia.

2019: The Voice 

On 2 June 2019,  Vidgen returned to television on The Voice Australia. In an interview with Who magazine, Vidgen said "After winning Australia’s Got Talent there was Facebook pages with death threats... life was hard..." adding "I stopped singing five years ago. I think I just burnt out. I just fell out of love with singing." Vidgen selected Guy Sebastian as his coach, eventually finishing as a semi-finalist before elimination.

2019–2020: Australia Decides
In December 2019, Vidgen was announced as a participant in Eurovision – Australia Decides 2020 in an attempt to represent Australia in the Eurovision Song Contest 2020. 
The judges were Josh Martin, Kate Miller-Heidke, Måns Zelmerlöw, Milly Petriella and Paul Clarke. There was a public vote as well.

Vidgen took part with the song "I Am King I Am Queen" a song co-written by him and Andrew Lowden. He received 19 points from the judges and 15 points from the televote for a total of 34 points, and placed 8th in a field of 10 contestants. Montaigne won with a total of 107 points earning the right to represent Australia in Eurovision. The contest was eventually cancelled because of the COVID-19 pandemic.

2020–present: America's Got Talent, I'm a Celebrity! and The Masked Singer

In January 2020, Vidgen appeared on the second season of America's Got Talent: The Champions. In January 2021, he appeared on the seventh season of I'm a Celebrity...Get Me Out of Here! Australia and was the first contestant to be eliminated. In October 2021, Vidgen was revealed as the "Kebab" on The Masked Singer (Australian season 3), making it to the semi-finals. In 2022, Vidgen competed on The Challenge: Australia.

Discography

Studio albums

Singles

Awards and nominations

References

External links 
 
 

1997 births
Australia's Got Talent winners
Australian child singers
Living people
People educated at Sydney Distance Education High School
21st-century Australian singers
21st-century Australian male singers
I'm a Celebrity...Get Me Out of Here! (Australian TV series) participants
Gay musicians
Australian LGBT singers
20th-century Australian LGBT people
21st-century Australian LGBT people
The Challenge (TV series) contestants